Karl Alfred Ingvald Næss (26 April 1877 – 6 July 1955) was a Norwegian speed skater. He set the men's world record for 500 meter speed skating on 5 February 1893 at 49.4 seconds in Hamar, Norway. He then broke his own world record 21 days later on 26 February 1893 at 48.0 seconds, then lowered it to 47.0 seconds on 24 February 1894 at Hamar. He was the youngest European champion of all time, in 1895 he was 17 years and 276 days when he won the European Speed Skating Championships for Men.

Biography
He was born on 26 April 1877 to Anne Jette Jensen (1847–?) of Kragerø or Skåtøy; and Kristian Andersen Næss (1848–?) of Grue, Norway. He was baptized as "Karl Alfred Ingvald Næss" on 27 May 1877 in the Garnison Menighet, in Oslo, Norway, but he always used the name "Alfred Næss". His father, Christian, was an army sergeant. Alfred had two siblings: Carl Albert Næss (1874–?); and Alvilde Marie Magdalene Næss (1875–1933) who married Thorvald Martin Tandberg (1874–1970). Næss grew up in Vika. On 6 February 1897 in Montreal, Quebec, Canada, he competed against Canadian Jack McCulloch in the 1,500-meter race, McCulloch and Næss tied, invoking a run-off. McCulloch won the run-off by two-fifths of a second. Also on 6 February 1897 Næss equaled the world record of 46.8 seconds set by Wilhelm Mauseth on 3 February 1895 in Trondheim, Norway, but on 7 February 1897 the record was broken by Peder Østlund with a time of 46.6. After Montreal he visited his sister in Portland, Maine, and gave a demonstration on 17 February 1897.

Næss won the Norwegian Allround Championships in Oslo in 1898, with gold medals in the 500 meter and the 1,500 meter, and a silver medal in the 5,000 meter. He set world records on three occasions in the 500 meter at Akersvika on Lake Mjøsa in Hamar, Norway. His best time was 47.0 in the European championships in 1894. Næss was in three European championships and three world championships, and he won the 500 meter race in two European championships and two world championships.

He went on the vaudeville circuit doing ice skate tricks on ice he would create in the theaters. In 1913 Næss returned to the United States. He married Agnes Mjolstad on 18 September 1919 in Manhattan, New York City and in 1920 he was living in a rented room in Manhattan.

He died on 6 July 1955 in Austria and was buried in Austria.

Legacy
Næss was the maternal uncle of Carl Frederick Tandberg, the bass musician. 
His partner in paired skating was Freda Maier-Westorgaard of Frankenberg (c. 1890 – 1976) who died in Strasshof an der Nordbahn, Austria, in 1976.

Personal bests

Tournament results
Between 1894 and 1900 he competed in seven tournaments:

Personal 500 meters progression 

Between 1893 and 1894 he lowered his record in the 500 meter skate from 50.0 seconds to 46.8 seconds, setting three world records:

See also
List of speed skating records
World record progression 500 m speed skating men

References

External links

Alfred Naess at SpeedSkatingStats.com

Alfred Næss at Findagrave

1877 births
1955 deaths
Norwegian male speed skaters
World record setters in speed skating
Vaudeville performers
Norwegian emigrants to the United States
Norwegian emigrants to Austria
Sportspeople from Oslo